Edgar Township may refer to one of the following townships in the United States:

 Edgar Township, Edgar County, Illinois
 Edgar Township, Clay County, Nebraska

Township name disambiguation pages